Ildjarn was a Norwegian cult black metal project that formed in 1991. Ildjarn recorded music until 1997 but did not officially end until 2005. The man behind Ildjarn was Vidar Våer, although some releases were collaborations with a musician known as Nidhogg.

History
The band was formed in 1991. The band's music was a very raw, fast, simple and lo-fi brand of black metal, with most songs composed of basic drum patterns, a couple of riffs, and unintelligible vocals. The band's style has been compared to hardcore punk in its simplistic ferocity and short song lengths. Two Ildjarn albums were made entirely on a synthesizer. Of all the released music, the only Ildjarn song to have its lyrics published was "Eksistensens Jeger", from the self-titled Ildjarn-Nidhogg (2003) compilation.

In 2006, the band website stated that no more news would be printed, leading to the conclusion that Ildjarn had ended. The title of Ildjarn's 2005 release, Ildjarn is Dead, further supports this conclusion.  Part of Vidar Våer's motivation for ending Ildjarn was due to his 4-track recorder breaking (the same 4-track recorder used during Emperor's early days as Thou Shalt Suffer).

Related bands
The related band Sort Vokter consisted of Ildjarn, Nidhogg and two other members known as Tvigygre and Heiinghund. They released only one album called Folkloric Necro Metal.

Discography 
1992 – Unknown Truths – demo
1992 – Seven Harmonies of Unknown Truths – demo
1993 – Ildjarn – demo
1993 – Norse – EP (black metal release with Nidhogg)
1994 – Minnesjord – demo
1995 – Ildjarn – album
1996 – Forest Poetry – album
1996 – Landscapes – album
1996 – Strength and Anger – album
1996 – Svartfråd – EP (black metal release with Nidhogg)
2002 – Hardangervidda – album (ambient release with Nidhogg)
2002 – Hardangervidda Part 2 – EP (ambient release with Nidhogg)
2004 – Nocturnal Visions – EP
2013 – Those Once Might Fallen – Split with Hate Forest

Compilation albums
1995 – Det Frysende Nordariket – contains Ildjarn Demo, Norse, Minnesjord
2002 – 1992-1995  – contains a collection of songs from 1992–1995
2003 – Ildjarn-Nidhogg – contains the two black metal releases with Nidhogg: Norse and Svartfråd
2005 – Ildjarn 93 – contains previously unreleased songs from 1993
2005 – Ildjarn is Dead – contains all demos and the outtakes from those demos

Members 
 Ildjarn (Vidar Våer) – vocals, electric guitar, bass guitar, drums, synthesizer
 Nidhogg – vocals, keyboard, drums (occasional member)
 Samoth – vocals (occasional member)
 Ihsahn – vocals (occasional member)

References

External links 
 
 Ildjarn on MusicMight
 Bandcamp by Season of Mist

Dark ambient music groups
Norwegian ambient music groups
Norwegian black metal musical groups
Musical groups established in 1991
1991 establishments in Norway
Musical groups disestablished in 2005
2005 disestablishments in Norway
Musical groups from Telemark
One-man bands